The 1920–21 Missouri Tigers men's basketball team represented the University of Missouri in intercollegiate basketball during the 1920–21 season. The team finished the season with a 17–1 record and was retroactively named the 1920–21 national champion by the Premo-Porretta Power Poll. It was head coach Craig Ruby's first season coaching the team.

References

Missouri
Missouri Tigers men's basketball seasons
NCAA Division I men's basketball tournament championship seasons
Missouri Tigers Men's Basketball Team
Missouri Tigers Men's Basketball Team